Valérie Courtois (born 1 November 1990) is a Belgian volleyball player who plays as libero for Stade Français Paris Saint Cloud.

In 2013, she was named Best Libero of the European Championships.

Her brother, Thibaut is a professional football player.

Clubs
  VDK Gent Dames (2008–2012)
  VC Oudegem (2012–2013)
  Budowlani Łódź (2014–2015)
  Dresdner SC (2015–2017)
  Stade Français Paris Saint Cloud (2017-2019)

References

External links

 Profile at FIVB website

1990 births
Living people
Belgian women's volleyball players
Belgian expatriate sportspeople in Poland
Volleyball players at the 2015 European Games
European Games competitors for Belgium
Liberos
People from Bilzen
Sportspeople from Limburg (Belgium)
21st-century Belgian women
Belgian expatriate sportspeople in Germany
Expatriate volleyball players in Poland
Expatriate volleyball players in Germany
Expatriate volleyball players in France
Belgian expatriate sportspeople in France